This is a list of current mayors of cities and towns in Croatia. There are 128 directly elected Croatian mayors.

Key

List 

Updated on 12 June 2022.

See also
Croatian local elections
List of mayors of Zagreb
List of mayors of Rijeka
List of mayors of Osijek
List of mayors of Pula
List of mayors of Split
List of county prefects of Croatia

References

External links
 First round
 Second round

Elections in Croatia